Kim Jae-hwan (Hangul: 김재환; born 13 August 1996) is a South Korean badminton player. He graduated from the Jeonju Life Science High School, and now educated at the Wonkwang University. In his junior career, he had collected a gold and two bronzes at the World Junior Championships, and also three silvers and a bronze at the Asian Junior Championships. In 2016, he won the men's doubles title with his partnered Choi Sol-gyu at the World University Championships in Russia. At the same year, he won the BWF Grand Prix Gold tournament at the Korea Masters in the men's doubles event with Ko Sung-hyun. In 2017, he competed at the Taipei Summer Universiade and won the men's doubles gold together with Seo Seung-jae.

Achievements

Summer Universiade 
Men's doubles

World University Championships 
Men's doubles

BWF World Junior Championships 
Boys' doubles

Asian Junior Championships 
Boys' doubles

Mixed doubles

BWF Grand Prix (1 title) 
The BWF Grand Prix had two levels, the Grand Prix and Grand Prix Gold. It was a series of badminton tournaments sanctioned by the Badminton World Federation (BWF) and played between 2007 and 2017.

Men's doubles

  BWF Grand Prix Gold tournament
  BWF Grand Prix tournament

BWF International Challenge/Series (2 titles, 3 runners-up) 
Men's doubles

  BWF International Challenge tournament
  BWF International Series tournament

References

External links 
 

1996 births
Living people
People from Jeongeup
South Korean male badminton players
Badminton players at the 2018 Asian Games
Asian Games competitors for South Korea
Universiade gold medalists for South Korea
Universiade medalists in badminton
Medalists at the 2017 Summer Universiade
Sportspeople from North Jeolla Province
21st-century South Korean people